Lassie is a 1994 American adventure family film directed by Daniel Petrie, starring Tom Guiry, Helen Slater, Jon Tenney, Frederic Forrest, Richard Farnsworth, Michelle Williams and featuring the fictional collie Lassie.

Plot
The Turner family moves from Baltimore, Maryland, to the small town of Franklin Falls in Tazewell County, Virginia, hoping to start a new life. The move creates problems for everyone, especially 13-year-old Matt (Tom Guiry), who feels lost and alone in his new surroundings, and still has not come to terms with his father Steve's (Jon Tenney) remarriage to Laura (Helen Slater) after his mother's death. But with the help of a stray Collie dog named Lassie that the family takes in, Matt learns to adjust to his surroundings and his family's situation. After Lassie saves Matt's life from an aggressive gray wolf one night, the two form a bond.

However, as his father’s planned job falls through, Matt, with help from his grandfather, Len Collins (Richard Farnsworth), helps convince the family to start a sheep farm, which had been his mother's dream. While the Turners get to work, a ruthless neighbor and wealthy sheep farmer, Sam Garland (Frederic Forrest), will stop at nothing to prevent them from succeeding, because it means that they will be occupying some grazing land that he's used in the past. In addition, Sam has two sons, Josh (Clayton Barclay Jones) and Jim (Charlie Hofheimer) who attend school with Matt. Both boys dislike Matt, but Josh's hatred mainly stems from jealousy because a fellow student, April Porter (Michelle Williams), whom Josh likes, is more interested in Matt.

Eventually Sam, with the help of his sons and henchmen, steals the Turners’ new herd of sheep, and kidnaps Lassie. However, she manages to escape, and she and Matt get their sheep back. However Josh and Jim catch up to them, and in the ensuing scuffle Josh finds himself struggling in a raging river, heading for massive rapids and a waterfall. Matt manages to rescue him, but is unable to save himself. Lassie then rescues Matt, but ends up going over the waterfall herself, to Matt's horror. Sam, after learning that Matt had saved Josh's life, apologizes to the Turners for his actions and for the loss of Lassie. The Turners hold a memorial for Lassie at a nearby tree where Matt's mother had carved her initials years before, and Matt carves Lassie's name above his mother's initials. However, Lassie manages to survive the waterfall, and although injured, she returns home shortly afterwards and is reunited with Matt at his school.

Cast
 Howard as Lassie
 Tom Guiry as Matthew Turner
 Helen Slater as Laura Turner
 Jon Tenney as Steve Turner
 Brittany Boyd as Jennifer Turner
 Frederic Forrest as Sam Garland
 Richard Farnsworth as Len Collins
 Michelle Williams as April Porter
 Joe Inscoe as Pete Jarman
 Yvonne Brisendine as Mrs. Jarman
 Clayton Barclay Jones as Josh Garland
 Charlie Hofheimer as Jim Garland
 Jody Smith Strickler as Mildred Garland
 Margaret Peery as Mrs. Parker
 David Bridgewater as Customer
 Earnest Poole, Jr. as Highway Patrolman #1
 Jeffrey H. Gray as Highway Patrolman #2
 Robert B. Brittain as Grommet Fireman
 Rick Warner as Timid Neighbor
 Kelly L. Edwards as Smoking Girl
 Jordan Young as Smoking Boy
 Katie Massa as College Student

Filming locations
Lassie was primarily filmed in New York, Naro, and Boomer Island
Thompson Valley, VA

Reception
Lassie was released to positive reviews.

Peter Rainer of the Los Angeles Times, stated that "one of the drawbacks of the film’s syrupy approach—at least from a family-entertainment point of view—is that you keep waiting for danger and bad guys to liven things up. And, sure enough, the presence of Frederic Forrest as Sam Garland, the biggest and baddest sheep farmer in the state, turns out to be a boon. Perpetually scowling and sunglass-clad, Sam is a rude dude; he looks over his flock of sheep and sees only lamb chops on the hoof. His two young sons (Charlie Hofheimer and Clayton Barclay Jones) are like a pair of range-riding homunculi. You keep expecting the Garlands to get seriously nutty and take over the picture—maybe try to mate Lassie with a lamb, or spike the ol’ swimmin’ hole, or force-feed Matt’s kindly granddad (Richard Farnsworth) Puppy Chow. The producer of 'Lassie,' after all, is Lorne Michaels, executive producer of 'Saturday Night Live.' But even the Garlands are ultimately redeemed by the love of a dog. Their bark is worse than their bite. (On the other hand, Lassie’s bite is worse than her bark. Go figure.)"

Janet Maslin of The New York Times called Lassie "a stubbornly sweet, picturesque children's film" which "is inadvertently revealing about the people for whom it was ostensibly made. The mood is nostalgic but knowing; after all, no dog story with a soundtrack featuring the Beatles, Bob Dylan and the Allman Brothers can be considered precisely quaint. This film (from the producers of 'Coneheads') even presumes a degree of viewer cynicism about Lassie lore. Early in the story, a little girl named Jennifer Turner (Brittany Boyd) watches "Lassie" on television while her older, hipper brother Matt (Thomas Guiry) sneers. Matt doesn't believe in Santa Claus, and he doesn't think a 50's canine rerun can beat MTV." Maslin added: 

Lisa Schwarzbaum of Entertainment Weekly gave the film an A− grade and said that the film was "a remarkably clean, bracing production that does a difficult thing exceptionally well, depicting believably modern young people in a believably old-fashioned plot."

As of July 2021, the film holds a "fresh" rating of 88% on Rotten Tomatoes, based on 15 reviews.

Box office
The movie debuted at No. 9 at the US box office.

References

External links
 
 
 
 

1994 films
1990s adventure films
American children's adventure films
Paramount Pictures films
Films scored by Basil Poledouris
Films directed by Daniel Petrie
Films set on farms
Films set in Virginia
Films shot in Virginia
Films shot in West Virginia
Films with screenplays by Matthew Jacobs
Lassie films
Films with screenplays by Gary Ross
Films shot in Tazewell County, Virginia
Films produced by Lorne Michaels
1990s English-language films
1990s American films